Joseph Henry Harris (December 13, 1888 – October 24, 1952) was a Toronto manufacturer and politician. He was first elected to the House of Commons of Canada as the Conservative Member of Parliament for York East in the 1921 federal election. In 1938, he was a candidate at the Conservative leadership convention, placing third. He remained a Tory MP until his death in 1952.

Business and commerce 
Harris was a graduate of University of Toronto, President of W. Harris Co. Ltd., vice-president of Harris Coal Company, President of Dominion Canadian Organic Developments Ltd. (London, England)

Member of Parliament 
Harris represented the ridings of York East, Toronto—Scarborough and Danforth as a Member of Parliament in Canada for over 21 years.

Toronto East General Hospital 
As a resident of East Toronto, Harris activities and interests were many, characteristic of his interest in his fellow man and the welfare of the community he served, Harris was a spark for the campaign for funds for the Toronto East General Hospital in East York.

In this capacity, he acted as chairman of the board of governors for over twenty years, during this period his leadership and guidance were a tower of strength to the board during the establishment of policy and direction of the hospital.

See also 
East York
Toronto-Danforth
Scarborough

External links

1888 births
1952 deaths
Conservative Party of Canada (1867–1942) MPs
Members of the House of Commons of Canada from Ontario
Progressive Conservative Party of Canada MPs